A black tiger is a melanistic or pseudo-melanistic tiger.

Black Tiger may also refer to:

Penaeus monodon (Black tiger shrimp), one of the two most important species of farmed prawn
Black Tiger (album), a 1982 release by Y&T
Black Tiger (video game), an arcade game developed by the Japanese company Capcom in 1987
Black Tiger Kung Fu ("Hark Fu Moon") a.k.a. Fu Jow Pai a Chinese martial art
 Northern Black Tiger Kung Fu, a Chinese martial art
Black Tiger (rapper), a Swiss musician
Black Tiger (series), a series of novels on auto racing for young adults by Leonard Wibberley (Patrick O'Connor)
Black Tiger is a type of coffee served at Coffee People
Black Tiger (professional wrestling), a wrestling persona portrayed by several people including Eddie Guerrero
Black Tiger (manga), Osamu Akimoto's comic

Militant & Military
 Black Tigers, special suicidal troops of the Tamil Tigers, a guerilla/rebel organization based in Sri Lanka
 An airborne unit of the Royal Thai Army stationed in Lopburi
 Ravindra Kaushik, an Indian spy in Pakistan known by the pseudonym "Black Tiger"
Black Tiger (tank), also known as Kaplan MT, a tank jointly produced by Turkey and Indonesia.

Characters 
 Black Tiger (Fengshen Yanyi), Fengshen Yanyi characters
Black Tiger, an enemy from the video game Resident Evil
 Black Tiger, the evil twin of Tiger Mask, in the Tiger Mask manga series. This Black Tiger is also used as a professional wrestling gimmick
 Black Tiger Fighter Squadron, a squadron from the anime series Space Battleship Yamato

Fiction 
Black Tiger is an automobile in a series of novels by Patrick O'Connor.